Artem Valeriyovych Shevchenko is a Ukrainian TV journalist and manager, and is also the CEO of TVi channel.

Biography

Early years and education 

Artem Shevchenko was born October 30, 1977, in Dnipropetrovsk.

He worked in TV from high school. After three courses at the Faculty of Media and Communications of Dnipropetrovsk National University he transferred to the Institute of Journalism of Taras Shevchenko National University of Kyiv.

Career 

Artem Shevchenko worked as a journalist on the STB, ICTV, 1+1, Tonis and Inter channels. He was a presenter of television programs "Exclamation mark", "Exclamation mark: Daily" and "Special format" on TVi.

As a journalist, he has experience working as a reporter in covering military conflicts. He won an Award of the National Council for Television and Radio Broadcasting "TV-Triumph" in the category "Best Reporter" (2001).

In 2015, Shevchenko was appointed spokesperson of the Ministry of Internal Affairs of Ukraine. He resigned from the position in January 2022.

See also 

 TVi (channel)

References

External links 
 Blog of Artem Shevchenko on Ukrayinska Pravda 
 Artem Shevchenko on TBi website 

Ukrainian television managers
Ukrainian television presenters
Ukrainian television journalists
Oles Honchar Dnipro National University alumni
University of Kyiv, Journalism Institute alumni
1977 births
Living people